Gilberto Alfredo Murgas Fajardo (born January 22, 1981 in El Refugio, El Salvador) is a retired Salvadoran football player.

Club career
Nicknamed Gárgamel, he started his career as a midfielder for FAS, making his debut against Belizean side Acros Verdes in March 1999. He left FAS for Chalatenango in 2007 only to move on to play for Águila a year later.

After returning to FAS in July 2010 he decided to retire in 2011 and move to Houston, where he started a construction company.

International career
Murgas made his debut for El Salvador in a July 2000 friendly match against Mexico and has earned a total of 40 caps, scoring 4 goals.

He has represented his country in 6 FIFA World Cup qualification matches and played at the 2003, 2005 and 2007 UNCAF Nations Cups as well as at the 2003 CONCACAF Gold Cup.

His final international game was a February 2007 UNCAF Nations Cup match against Costa Rica.

International goals
Scores and results list El Salvador's goal tally first.

Personal life
Murgas has two children.

References

External links
 

1981 births
Living people
People from Ahuachapán Department
Association football central defenders
Association football midfielders
Salvadoran footballers
El Salvador international footballers
2003 UNCAF Nations Cup players
2003 CONCACAF Gold Cup players
2005 UNCAF Nations Cup players
2007 UNCAF Nations Cup players
C.D. FAS footballers
C.D. Chalatenango footballers
C.D. Águila footballers